"Elevators (Me & You)" is a song by American hip hop duo Outkast, released as the lead single from their second studio album, ATLiens. It peaked at number 12 on the Billboard Hot 100, Outkast's highest-peaking song on the chart until the release of "Ms. Jackson" in 2000. The single also peaked at number one on the US Hot Rap Tracks chart. It was later featured on their compilation Big Boi and Dre Present... OutKast. R&B singer Kandi Burruss sought out the song "Me & U" from her 2010 Kandi Koated CD.

Track listings
CD single
 "Elevators (Me & You)" (Clean Version) –  4:25
 "Elevators (Me & You)" (LP Version) – 4:25
 "Elevators (Me & You)" (LP Instrumental) – 4:25

Maxi single
 "Elevators (Me & You)" (Crazy "C" Trunk Rattlin' Mix) – 4:35
 "Elevators (Me & You)" (ONP 86 Mix) – 4:35
 "Elevators (Me & You)" (ONP 86 Instrumental) – 4:36
 "Elevators (Me & You)" (Album Version) – 4:25
 "Elevators (Me & You)" (Crazy "C" Trunk Rattlin' Instrumental) – 4:33

12-inch single
 "Elevators (Me & You)" (Crazy "C" Trunk Rattlin' Mix) – 4:35
 "Elevators (Me & You)" (ONP 86 Mix) – 4:35
 "Elevators (Me & You)" (Acappella) – 4:00
 "Elevators (Me & You)" (Crazy "C" Trunk Rattlin' Instrumental) – 4:33
 "Elevators (Me & You)" (ONP 86 Instrumental) – 4:36
 "Elevators (Me & You)" (Album Version) – 4:25

Cassette single
 "Elevators (Me & You)" (Album Version) – 4:25
 "Elevators (Me & You)" (Album Instrumental) – 4:25

Credits and personnel
The credits for "Elevators (Me & You)" are adapted from the liner notes of ATLiens.
Studio locations
 Mastered at The Hit Factory, New York City, New York.
 Mixed at DARP Studios, Atlanta, Georgia.
 Recorded at Doppler Studios, PatchWerk Recording Studios and Studio LaCoCo, all in Atlanta, Georgia.

Personnel

 Outkast – drum programming, keyboard programming, mixing, production, songwriting, vocals
 John Frye – engineering
 John "Bernasky" Wall – engineering
 Jarvis Blackshear – engineering
 Derrick Williams – engineering
 Manuel K. Morris – engineering assistant
 Alex Lowe – engineering assistant

 Brian Frye – engineering assistant
 Neal Pogue – mixing
 Organized Noize – mixing
 Rico Lumpkin – mixing assistant
 Carlton Batts – mastering
 Preston Crump – bass
 Debra Killings – background vocals
 Sleepy Brown – background vocals

Charts

Weekly charts

Year-end charts

Certifications

In media
An edited version of this song is used in the season 1 finale of the FX television series Atlanta. Later, in the season 2 episode Barbershop, the intersection of Headland and Delowe Avenues in East Point, Georgia is depicted. This intersection is mentioned in the second line of the song. The song is also featured in the Grand Theft Auto V video game.

References

1995 songs
1996 singles
LaFace Records singles
Outkast songs
Songs written by André 3000
Songs written by Big Boi